Wauneta is an unincorporated community in Yuma County, Colorado, United States.

Notes

Unincorporated communities in Yuma County, Colorado
Unincorporated communities in Colorado